Maufe is a surname. Notable people with the surname include: 

Edward Maufe (1882–1974), English architect and designer
Thomas Harold Broadbent Maufe (1898–1942), English recipient of the Victoria Cross

See also
Maude (name)